The discography of English singer and songwriter Neon Hitch. Neon's debut digital single "Get Over U" was released in February 2011. Hitch then released her single "Bad Dog", which was intended to be the lead single from her debut album. Later in 2011, she was featured on Gym Class Heroes' song "Ass Back Home". In 2012, Neon Hitch released "Fuck U Betta" and "Gold" featuring Tyga, her official first and second singles respectively. Both songs peaked at number one on the Billboard Dance/Club Play chart.

Neon then debuted an EP entitled Happy Neon in January 2013, which was released online for free. In October 2013, Neon announced that her debut album Beg, Borrow & Steal had been scrapped and she would release a new album that had more of her soul in it. In January 2014, Neon released the mixtape 301 to Paradise for free. In May 2014, it was announced that Hitch had parted ways with her label Warner Bros. and was gearing up to releasing her new debut album Eleutheromaniac; she also released Happy Neon and 301 to Paradise to digital retailers independently in the same month.

She premiered the lead single of Eleutheromaniac, "Yard Sale", in August 2014. In January 2015, Neon released "Sparks" as the first single from the album. In March 2015, Hitch released the EP 24:00 for free. In 2016, it was announced that Hitch had changed the name of her debut album to Anarchy, which was released on July 22, 2016. The lead single from the album, "Please", was released on July 8, 2016. The album did not contain any of the singles intended to be on Eluetheromaniac, but included a promomotional single she released in 2015, "Freedom".

After the release of her debut album, Hitch then released a single called ''Serious'' in tribute to the Pulse Nightclub shootings in June 2016.

In August 2017, Neon returned with a new single ''I Know You Wannit'' as a teaser for her upcoming sophomore studio album due out in 2018.

In July 2018, Hitch released two new singles Problem and Wall Street in support of her upcoming second album Reincarnation, released under her own label WeRNeon in January 2018.

Albums

EPs & Mixtapes

Singles

As lead artist

As featured artist

Promotional singles

Songwriting

Music videos

As lead artist

As featured artist

Other appearances

References

Discographies of British artists
Pop music discographies